Mark Canning may refer to:

 Mark Canning (footballer) (born 1983), Scottish footballer for Albion Rovers
 Mark Canning (diplomat) (born 1954), UK ambassador to Indonesia